The Union is a fictional criminal organization, which is the main antagonist to James Bond in the Raymond Benson novels High Time to Kill, Doubleshot and Never Dream of Dying (collectively known as the "Union trilogy").  It is primarily a mercenary organization, working for any third party that asks for their help.  Their actions include everything from petty theft and street crime to large scale acts of terrorism or industrial espionage.  Much of their success rests on their uncanny ability to infiltrate law enforcement and intelligence agencies, which makes them a very difficult target when Bond and MI6 try to bring the Union down.

Background 
The Union was originally created by Taylor Michael Harris, an ex-Marine and former militia movement leader.  Harris created the Union as a simple mercenary organization in Portland, Oregon, recruiting people from North America, Western Europe, the former Eastern Bloc and the Middle-East.

However, Harris was soon murdered by Corsican criminal Olivier Cesari, who conspired with several financial backers and with Harris' lieutenants to take control of the organization.  Known only by his title "Le Gérant" (the manager), Cesari quickly expanded the Union's affairs, turning it from an unremarkable band of thugs into a professional criminal organization, truly international in scope and run with the efficiency of a major corporation.  By the time of James Bond's involvement with them, they were already known to MI6 as the most dangerous criminal organization in the world.

Appearances 

In High Time to Kill, Bond's relationship with the Union begins when the Governor of the Bahamas, an old friend of Bond, is killed after failing to pay a debt to a member of the Union.  Upon returning to MI6 headquarters, Bond is coincidentally assigned to retrieve Skin 17, a new British aeronautical technology which the Union have stolen on behalf of the Chinese government.

The person carrying the Skin 17 technology dies in a plane crash on Kangchenjunga.  Bond is then assigned to an MI6 team attempting to recover Skin 17 from the top of the mountain.  Unknown to him, the Union infiltrates several members into his team, but he succeeds in eliminating them.  This marks the first failure by the Union to deliver as promised on one of its contracts.

In Doubleshot, the Union is now in league with Domingo Espada, a Spanish nationalist with ties to the mob, who dreams of taking Gibraltar back for Spain.  The Union agrees to support him, by assassinating the Governor of Gibraltar and the British Prime Minister by using a James Bond lookalike, thus severely hurting the British government and damaging MI6's credibility, in retaliation for the events in the previous novel.

Bond spends most of the novel attempting to track down the Union's headquarters in Morocco, successfully identifying Le Gérant as Olivier Cesari.  He is eventually captured by the Union, which was attempting to draw him in all along; however, he manages to escape and foils the Union's plans for Gibraltar by posing as his own double and foiling the assassination attempt.

By the time of Never Dream of Dying, Western law-enforcement agencies have declared an all-out war on the Union.  Bond and several friends from previous adventures (including Rene Mathis and Marc-Ange Draco) follow the Union to Corsica in an attempt to track down Olivier Cesari before he can carry out his next attack.

It is revealed near the end that Marc-Ange is Cesari's uncle, and was working for him all along.  Bond, however, suspects that Marc-Ange is not being entirely truthful, and feeds him false information in order to plan a surprise attack on the Union headquarters in Corsica; Cesari dies when his helicopter is destroyed, as does Marc-Ange, ending the scourge of the Union once and for all.

Known members 
 Union leadership
 Taylor Michael Harris (deceased); a former Marine and leader of a white supremacist militia.
 Olivier Cesari; a blind man with extrasensory perception, born to a French Corsican father and a Moroccan Berber mother, who uses his connections on both sides of the Mediterranean to support the Union's activities.  Known as Le Gérant, the manager.
 Other members
 Marc-Ange Draco; former head of the Unione Corse, and one of Cesari's silent partners.
 Nadir Yassassin; the Union's master strategist.
 Margareta Piel; chief assassin.
 James "Jimmy" Powers; chief tracker.
 Julius Wilcox; Cesari's second in command.
 Paul Baak.
 Steven Harding.
 Roland Marquis.

Concept and creation 
Raymond Benson, the writer who created the Union, describes then as "a blue-collar version of SPECTRE", adding that unlike Ian Fleming's creation, "they don't have any qualms about doing low-rent jobs.  I guess they work more like a Mafia, with "cells" all over the world".

See also 
List of James Bond villains

References 

James Bond organisations
Fictional organized crime groups